The Fourth Wisconsin Legislature convened from January 8, 1851, to March 17, 1851 in regular session. Senators representing odd-numbered districts were newly elected for this session and were serving the first year of a two-year term.  Assembly members were elected to a one-year term.  Assembly members and odd-numbered senators were elected in the general election of November 5, 1850. Senators representing even-numbered districts were serving the second year of their two-year term, having been elected in the general election held on November 6, 1849.

Major events

 January 20, 1851: The Wisconsin Legislature, in joint session, re-elected Henry Dodge to a six-year term as United States Senator.
 November 4, 1851: Leonard J. Farwell elected Governor of Wisconsin.

Major legislation

 January 22, 1851: Joint resolution in relation to the Honorable Isaac P. Walker, 1851 Joint Resolution 1
 February 1, 1851: Act to incorporate the Fire Department of the City of Milwaukee, 1851 Act 26
 February 4, 1851: Act providing for the election of a Chief Justice, 1851 Act 39
 February 6, 1851: Act to set apart and incorporate the County of Oconto, 1851 Act 44
 February 11, 1851: Act to set apart and incorporate Door County, 1851 Act 66
 February 15, 1851: Act to set apart and incorporate the County of Waushara, 1851 Act 77
 February 17, 1851: Act to incorporate the County of Waupaca, 1851 Act 78
 February 17, 1851: Act to divide the county of Brown and create the county of Outagamie, 1851 Act 83
 March 10, 1851: Act to prevent the killing of deer in certain months of the year, 1851 Act 171
 March 11, 1851: Act to change the name of the town of "Pike" in Kenosha county to "Somers," 1851 Act 211

Party summary

Senate summary

Assembly summary

Sessions
 1st Regular session: January 8, 1851–March 17, 1851

Leaders

Senate leadership
 President of the Senate: Samuel Beall, Lieutenant Governor
 President pro tempore: Duncan Reed

Assembly leadership
 Speaker of the Assembly: Frederick W. Horn

Members

Members of the Senate
Members of the Wisconsin Senate for the Fourth Wisconsin Legislature:

Members of the Assembly
Members of the Assembly for the Fourth Wisconsin Legislature:

Employees

Senate employees
 Chief Clerk: William Hull
 Sergeant-at-Arms: E. D. Masters

Assembly employees
 Chief Clerk: Alexander T. Gray
 Sergeant-at-Arms: Charles S. Kingsbury

References

External links

1851 in Wisconsin
Wisconsin
Wisconsin legislative sessions